Master of Theology (abbreviated MTh, ThM,  or MTheol) is a post-graduate degree offered by universities, divinity schools, and seminaries. It can serve as a transition degree for entrance into a PhD program or as a stand-alone terminal degree depending on ones particular educational background and institution of study. In North America, the ThM typically requires at least 2–3 years of prerequisite graduate study for entrance into the program, typically a Master of Divinity or equivalent.

Coursework 
The Master of Theology often includes one or two years of specialized advanced and/or doctoral level studies in theological research (i.e. counseling, church history, systematic theology, etc.). Depending on the institution, it may or may not require comprehensive examinations and a research thesis, but is required to produce "learning outcomes that demonstrate advanced competency in one area or discipline of theological study and capacity to conduct original research in that area."

North America 
In North America, the Association of Theological Schools requires a Master of Theology, or the equivalent Master of Sacred Theology, to be the minimum educational credential for teaching theological subjects in its accredited seminaries and graduate schools. The Association of Theological Schools classifies both degrees as "Advanced Programs Oriented Toward Theological Research and Teaching."

The Master of Theology often functions as a terminal level degree, dependent upon one's particular educational route or institution of study. Some institutions award a Master of Theology en route to a Doctor of Philosophy or Doctor of Theology.

See also 
 Master of Divinity

References 

Christian education
Theology
Religious degrees